Young Sherlock Holmes: Black Ice is the third novel in the Young Sherlock Holmes series that depicts Arthur Conan Doyle's detective Sherlock Holmes as a teenager in the 1860s. It was written by Andy Lane and released in the United Kingdom on June 3, 2011 by Macmillan Books. It is preceded in the series by Young Sherlock Holmes: Red Leech and is followed byYoung Sherlock Holmes: Fire Storm.

Plot summary
Mycroft Holmes invites Sherlock and his tutor, Amyus Crowe, to London for a visit. When they arrive at the Diogenes Club, they find Mycroft holding a dagger over a dead body. The police arrive and arrest Mycroft, leaving Sherlock and Amyus to prove their brother's innocence. They find clues at the murder scene: a business card, a small bottle with a clear liquid in it, and a small wooden case. They determine that the business card is freshly printed and look for printers around London who might have created it.

The pair split up and Sherlock locates the right Gooder, which leads him to a bouncer in a local tavern. Sherlock tails the bouncer, but the bouncer manages to turn the tables on him and chases Sherlock into the sewers inhabited by London's abandoned and feral children. Sherlock has to run to escape them and ends up at the London Necropolis Railway.

Sherlock and Amyus meet up again and have a dangerous encounter with a falcon in an animal museum. From there it becomes evident that events occurring in Russia may be linked to Mycroft's frame-up. Due to the mysterious disappearance of Mycroft's agent, Robert Wormesley, who was located in Moscow, Sherlock and Mycroft accompanied by Rufus Stone will have to go to Moscow. Sherlock, as a part of their disguise, joins a traveling theatre troupe to Russia to uncover the truth.

In Russia, they find Wormesley's house in a state of chaos, it is apparent that someone was searching for several objects. On their way back to the hotel, Sherlock is framed for pick-pocketing. Sherlock then runs as the police are on his trail; he soon finds himself in a dead-end and the only way to escape is via a manhole.

While he descends, he can hear the people who sent him state that the manhole led to a tributary
of the Moscow river, the Neglinnaya, Sherlock then goes downstream to make it to the river. He is chased by the people who set him up. While navigating through the river he meets a pack of dogs that have adapted to survive in dark tunnels. Sherlock sees that they have ears larger than ordinary and speculates that their sense of hearing is greater than those of normal dogs. Knowing this, Sherlock does not make a noise, but due to the twitching of his finger, the dogs get ready to pounce on him. At that moment, Sherlock's pursuer has his hand over Sherlock's neck; his hand is bitten by the dog and he loosens his grip which allows Sherlock to escape.

Sherlock soon finds his way into the Moscow river and climbs up its banks, only to see Mycroft being arrested by Russian secret police-the Third Section. He is then met by Robert Wormesley who was watching Mycroft's arrest and tells him that they both will have to plan the next move to save Mycroft's life.

The two men stop by a cafe to have a chat. whereupon Sherlock deduces that Mycroft was being taken to be framed for the murder of Count Shuvalov and that Wormesley is against him. Rufus Stone sets fire to the cafe which helps Sherlock escape from Wormesley. Sherlock and Stone reach the building where Mycroft and Count Shuvalov are located. Once there, they lure away the falcon that was trained to kill Shuvalov.

Characters

Sherlock Holmes

Sherlock Holmes has grown since the events of his previous two adventures and he is not afraid to take his own initiative. When he realizes that Amyus will not be accompanying him to Russia, he is initially disappointed and worried about how he will perform without his mentor, but soon grows in confidence. On the other hand, his relationship with Rufus Stone becomes more complex when Mycroft reveals a secret about Stone. His admiration for his older brother Mycroft continues to grow.

Mycroft Holmes

Sherlock's older brother, who works in espionage, invites Sherlock and Amyus to visit him in London and is quickly framed for murder. In an unprecedented move, Mycroft breaks his fixed orbit and takes a trip to Russia to investigate whether or not events in that country are related to his murder accusation.

Amyus Crowe

Amyus helps Sherlock investigate Mycroft's murder accusation. Being Sherlock's tutor he is attempting to hone his observational and deductive skills.

Rufus Stone

References

External links
 Official Young Sherlock Holmes site (UK)
 Official Young Sherlock Holmes series site (U.S.)
 Chapter 1 of Black Ice

Young Sherlock Holmes book series
Novels set in Victorian England
2010 British novels
Novels by Andy Lane
British detective novels
Sherlock Holmes pastiches
Fiction set in the 1860s
Novels set in London
Sherlock Holmes novels
Macmillan Publishers books